is a railway station in the city of Toyota, Aichi, Japan, operated by Meitetsu.

Lines
Wakabayashi Station is served by the Meitetsu Mikawa Line and is 6.2 kilometers from the terminus of the line at Chiryū Station.

Station layout
The station  has a single island platform connected to the station building by a level crossing. The station has automated ticket machines, Manaca automated turnstiles and is unattended.

Platforms

Adjacent stations

|-
!colspan=5|Nagoya Railroad

Station history
Wakabayashi Station was opened on July 5, 1920, as a station on the privately owned Mikawa Railway. The Mikawa Railway was merged with Meitetsu on June 1, 1941.

Passenger statistics
In fiscal 2017, the station was used by an average of 6051 passengers daily (boarding passengers only).

Surrounding area
 Toyota Minami High School
Wakabayashi Nishi Elementary School
Wakabayashi Higashi Elementary School

See also
 List of Railway Stations in Japan

References

External links

 Official web page 

Railway stations in Japan opened in 1920
Railway stations in Aichi Prefecture
Stations of Nagoya Railroad
Toyota, Aichi